The  is a railway line in Iga, Mie, Japan, operated by the private railway operator . The line connects Iga-Ueno Station with Iga-Kambe Station. The track and trains are owned by Kintetsu Railway, although the trains are operated by Iga Railway. Cars in the line have a face illustrated at their end.

Stations
All stations are in Iga, Mie.

Rolling stock
 860 series 2-car EMUs
 200 series 2-car EMUs (ex-Tokyu 1000 series), since 24 December 2009

200 series
The Iga Railway operates five two-car 200 series EMUs formed from ten former Tokyu 1000 series cars purchased between 2009 and 2012.

Formations

Car identities
The former identities of the fleet are as shown below.

History

The original Iga Railway opened the 26 km 1,067 mm gauge line between Iga-Ueno on the Kansai Main Line and Nishi-Nabari on 18 July 1922. The line was electrified at 600 V DC on 25 May 1926. The company merged with the Osaka Electric Railway on 31 March 1929.

The Iga-Kambe to Nishi-Nabari section closed in 1964.

Operation of the line was transferred to the (new) Iga Railway on 1 October 2007.

References

External links
  

Rail transport in Mie Prefecture
Kintetsu Railway
1067 mm gauge railways in Japan